Harold Hunter (1974–2006) was an American skateboarder and actor.

Harold Hunter may also refer to:

Harold Hunter (basketball) (1926–2013), American basketball coach and player
Buddy Hunter (Harold James Hunter, born 1947), American baseball player
Harold D. Hunter, American Pentecostal scholar

See also
Hal Hunter (disambiguation)
Harry Hunter (disambiguation)